Hymenobacter defluvii is a  Gram-negative, aerobic and non-motile bacterium from the genus of Hymenobacter which has been isolated from a wastewater treatment facility in Korea.

References 

defluvii
Bacteria described in 2018